Chryseobacterium indologenes  is a Gram-negative and non-motile bacteria from the genus of Chryseobacterium which has been isolated from a human. Chryseobacterium indologenes is a pathogen of American bullfrogs (Lithobates catesbeianus) and humans.

Further reading

External links
 Chryseobacterium indologenes at MicrobeWiki
Type strain of Chryseobacterium indologenes at BacDive -  the Bacterial Diversity Metadatabase

References 

indologenes
Bacteria described in 1994